was a town located in Haibara District, Shizuoka Prefecture, Japan.

As of April 1, 2005, the town had an estimated population of 24,989 and a density of 468.3 persons per km². The total area was 53.36 km².

On October 11, 2005, Haibara, along with town of Sagara (also from Haibara District), was merged to create the city of Makinohara, and thus no longer exists as an independent municipality.

Dissolved municipalities of Shizuoka Prefecture
Makinohara, Shizuoka